Lindsay Davenport was the defending champion, but decided not to participate that year.

Patty Schnyder won the title, defeating Akiko Morigami 6–4, 6–0 in the final.

Seeds

Draw

Finals

Top half

Bottom half

References

External links
 http://itftennis.com/procircuit/tournaments/women's-tournament/info.aspx?tournamentid=1100012308

Singles